The 2018 United States Senate election in New York took place on November 6, 2018. Incumbent U.S. Senator Kirsten Gillibrand was re-elected to a second full term, defeating Republican Chele Chiavacci Farley.

As of 2021, this, along with the concurrent comptroller election is the last time Ontario, Seneca, Cayuga, Oneida, Washington, Otsego, Saint Lawrence and Sullivan counties have voted Democratic in a statewide election.

Democratic primary
Kirsten Gillibrand ran unopposed in the primary and automatically became the Democratic nominee.

Candidates

Nominee
 Kirsten Gillibrand, incumbent U.S. Senator

Failed to file
 Scott Noren, oral and maxillofacial surgeon

Declined

Chelsea Clinton, daughter of former Senator Hillary Clinton
 Andrew Cuomo, incumbent New York Governor
Caroline Kennedy, former United States Ambassador to Japan, daughter of former President John F. Kennedy and member of the Kennedy family
 Andrew Yang, entrepreneur (ran for Democratic presidential nomination in 2020)

Republican primary

The Republican Party had nominated private equity executive Chele Chiavacci Farley.

Candidates

Nominee
 Chele Chiavacci Farley, private equity executive

Failed to file
 Rocky De La Fuente, businessman and perennial candidate
 Patrick John Hahn, civic activist
 Rafael Arden Jones Sr.
 David A. Webber

Declined
 Chris Gibson, former U.S. Representative
 Joseph Holland, former Commissioner of the Department of Housing and Community Renewal (running for Governor)

General election

Endorsements

Predictions

†Highest rating given

Polling

Results

References

External links
Candidates at Vote Smart  
Candidates at Ballotpedia  
Campaign finance at FEC  
Campaign finance at OpenSecrets

Official campaign websites
Kirsten Gillibrand (D) for Senate
Chele Farley (R) for Senate

2018
New York
United States Senate
Kirsten Gillibrand